= GS-6620 =

Chemical compound

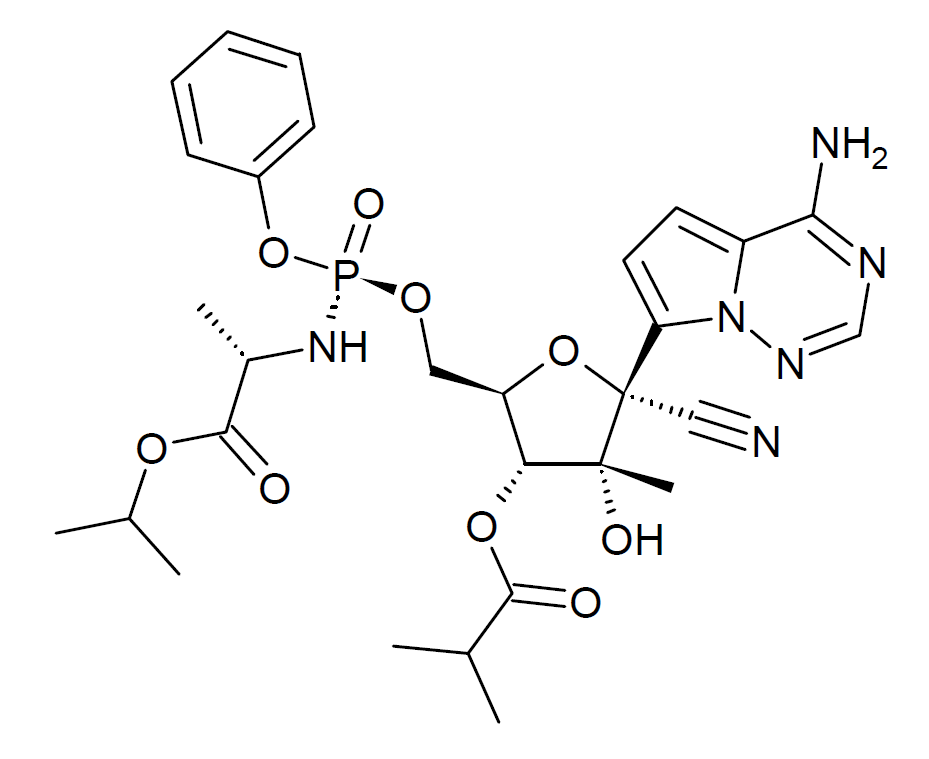

Clinical data
- Trade names: GS-6620

Legal status
- Legal status: US: Investigational New Drug

Identifiers
- IUPAC name: [(2R,3R,4R,5R)-5-(4-Aminopyrrolo[2,1-f][1,2,4]triazin-7-yl)-5-cyano-4-hydroxy-4-methyl-2-[[[[(2S)-1-oxo-1-propan-2-yloxypropan-2-yl]amino]-phenoxyphosphoryl]oxymethyl]oxolan-3-yl] 2-methylpropanoate
- CAS Number: 1350735-70-4
- PubChem CID: 58059494
- ChemSpider: 31141332
- UNII: WD5DUG7X38
- ChEMBL: ChEMBL3120792
- CompTox Dashboard (EPA): DTXSID60159240

Chemical and physical data
- Formula: C_{29}H_{37}N_{6}O_{9}P
- Molar mass: 644.622 g·mol^{−1}
- 3D model (JSmol): Interactive image
- SMILES: C[C@@H](C(=O)OC(C)C)NP(=O)(OC[C@@H]1[C@H]([C@@]([C@](O1)(C#N)C2=CC=C3N2N=CN=C3N)(C)O)OC(=O)C(C)C)OC4=CC=CC=C4
- InChI: InChI=1S/C29H37N6O9P/c1-17(2)26(36)42-24-22(43-29(15-30,28(24,6)38)23-13-12-21-25(31)32-16-33-35(21)23)14-40-45(39,44-20-10-8-7-9-11-20)34-19(5)27(37)41-18(3)4/h7-13,16-19,22,24,38H,14H2,1-6H3,(H,34,39)(H2,31,32,33)/t19-,22+,24+,28+,29-,45?/m0/s1; Key:YAAQYJCOIFNMKX-CVANIGNKSA-N

GS-6620 is an antiviral drug which is a nucleotide analogue. It was developed for the treatment of Hepatitis C but while it showed potent antiviral effects in early testing, it could not be successfully formulated into an oral dosage form due to low and variable absorption in the intestines which made blood levels unpredictable. It has however continued to be researched as a potential treatment for other viral diseases such as Ebola virus disease.
